Resonnances is a 2006 French science-fiction film written and directed by Philippe Robert. It stars Marjorie Dubesset, Franck Monsigny and Sophie Michard.

Plot
After the three law students Thomas, Yann and Vincent have passed their tests, it says "party time". The aim of the boisterous Party Weekend is the low-lying forest in a disco "Panorama". Along the way they meet at a gas station acting suspiciously leaving the hitch-hiker Sébastien, whom they take in spite of the news story about a psychopath who had escaped.

Just when this begins to show his nasty side, they got into an unnaturally dense mist coming off the road and plunging into a deep ravine. The fatal crash is however hampered by the thick branches of fir trees, so that the four men arrive, although injured, some seriously, but still alive on the ground. No reception for mobile phones, the next village several kilometers away, a mortally wounded friend, and probably a psychopathic killer in their group.

As the men have to quickly discover, has taken root in the ground beneath their feet a bit. Something very big. Something that moves fast in the ground as the men on the earth.  And it prefers to eat men!

Cast
 Johanna Andraos		
 Marjorie Dubesset		
 Vincent Lecompte		
 Sophie Michard		
 Franck Monsigny		
 Patrick Mons		
 Romain Ogerau		
 Livane Revel		
 Yann Sundberg		
 Thomas Vallegeas

Release
The film premiered on 5 April 2007 as part of the Festival Mauvais and was released as Direct to DVD on 9 April 2008 in France.

Soundtrack
The soundtrack was composed by British musician Richard Sanderson.

References

External links 
 
 Official Site

2006 films
2000s French-language films
French horror films
2000s science fiction horror films
2006 horror films
2000s monster movies
2000s French films